Ch'uch'u Apachita (Aymara ch'uch'u cold, cold liquid, apachita the place of transit of an important pass in the principal routes of the Andes; name in the Andes for a stone cairn, a little pile of rocks built along the trail in the high mountains, also spelled Chuchu Apacheta, Chunchu Apacheta) is a  mountain in the Andes of Bolivia. It is situated in the La Paz Department, Larecaja Province, Sorata Municipality. Ch'uch'u Apachita lies north of the main range of the Cordillera Real, south to southwest of the mountain Ch'uch'u, northwest of Chunta Qullu and east of Jukumarini. This is where the river Ch'uch'u Jawira originates.

See also 
 Llawi Imaña

References 

Mountains of La Paz Department (Bolivia)